Taste of Edmonton is an annual outdoor festival held in Edmonton, Alberta.  In 2021, the festival will be held at Churchill Square (100 Street) as 2020 went on hiatus. The festival runs for 11 days, July 22nd – August 1st. Hours are 11:00–23:00 daily except for Aug. 1st, 11:00–21:00. 

Taste of Edmonton is the largest food and entertainment festival in Western Canada, welcoming more than 350,000 attendees together to sample the best local restaurants, chefs, food trucks, and alcoholic beverages - and to stay for an all-Canadian concert series.

The festival was chosen as Edmonton's Favourite Festival in 2018 by PostMedia readers  and a finalist for Tourism Event or Festival of the Year for the 2019 Alberta Tourism Awards.

There was no festival in 2020.

See also
Festivals in Alberta

References

External links
 Official website

Festivals in Edmonton
Food and drink festivals in Canada
July events
Recurring events established in 1984
1984 establishments in Alberta
Annual events in Canada
Food and drink in Alberta